Batha Ouest or Batha West is one of the three departments which make up the region of Batha in Chad. The capital is Ati.

sub-prefectures 
Batha Ouest is divided into three sub-prefectures:
 Ati
 Djedda
 Koundjourou

References 

Departments of Chad
Batha Region